Duke of Coimbra was an aristocratic Portuguese title with the level of royal dukedom, that is, associated with the Portuguese royal house, created in 1415, by King John I of Portugal to his 2nd male son, Infante Pedro. Pedro was regent of the kingdom but he was killed in the domestic Battle of Alfarrobeira (1449).

None of their children inherited this title, which was granted much later to Pedro's great-grandson, Jorge, Duke of Coimbra, natural son of King John II of Portugal.

List of the Dukes of Coimbra
Infante Pedro, Duke of Coimbra (1392–1449), Regent, King João I's third son (second surviving);
Jorge, Duke of Coimbra (1481–1550), King João II's natural son;
Infante Augusto, Duke of Coimbra (1847–1889), Queen Maria II's fifth son;

Claimants 
Following the establishment of the Portuguese Republic, the following individuals have claimed the title of Duke of Coimbra:
Infante Henrique, Duke of Coimbra (1949–2017), Duarte Nuno, Duke of Braganza's third son;
Infanta Maria Francisca, Duchess of Coimbra (born 1997), Duarte Pio, Duke of Braganza's daughter.

See also

List of Portuguese Dukedoms

External links

 Genealogy of the Dukes of Coimbra – Portuguese Genealogical site

Bibliography

”Nobreza de Portugal e do Brasil" – Vol. I, pages 255/272; and Vol. II, pages 531/532. Published by Zairol Lda., Lisbon 1989.

Dukedoms of Portugal
Portuguese nobility
 
1415 establishments in Portugal